The Yamaha CT2 was an early version of the popular 175cc Trail/Enduro motorcycle. The CT2 followed on from the CT1C, and was superseded by the CT3. There are only minor differences between each version. 

The CT series was replaced with the DT175 from 1974 onwards. 

The CT3 was the basis for the original Yamaha AG175 released in 1974, and many parts are interchangeable between the two (and earlier CT variants). 

Yamaha CT series timeline:

 CT1A - 1969
 CT1B - 1970
 CT1C - 1971
 CT2 - 1972
 CT3 - 1973

CT2
Off-road motorcycles